James R. Cymbala (born 1942) is an American author and pastor of the Brooklyn Tabernacle. He is also a former college basketball player, serving on the teams for the United States Naval Academy and the University of Rhode Island.

Cymbala's best-selling books include Fresh Wind, Fresh Fire; Fresh Faith; and Fresh Power. In 2002, Cymbala was nominated for a Dove Award for Musical of the Year, for his work on Light Of The World, along with his wife, Carol Cymbala and their 270-voice Brooklyn Tabernacle Choir. He has been the pastor of the multi-racial megachurch The Brooklyn Tabernacle, since 1971. When he began serving The Brooklyn Tabernacle, the church membership numbered fewer than 30 persons. , the church numbers over 16,000 members. The Cymbalas have three children and nine grandchildren.

Published works 
 Fresh Wind, Fresh Fire: What Happens When God's Spirit Invades the Hearts of His People, Zondervan, 1997. 
 Fresh Faith: What Happens When Real Faith Ignites God's People, Zondervan, 1999. 
 The Life God Blesses: The Secret of Enjoying God's Favor, Zondervan, 2001. 
 God's Grace from Ground Zero: Seeking God's Heart for the Future of Our World, Zondervan, 2001. 
 The Church God Blesses, Zondervan, 2002. 
 Fresh Power: What Happens When God Leads and You Follow, Zondervan, 2003. 
 Breakthrough Prayer: The Power of Connecting with the Heart of God, Zondervan, 2003. 
 Fresh Faith: What Happens When Real Faith Ignites God's People, Zondervan, 2003. 
 The Promise of God’s Power, Running Press Miniature Editions, 2003. 
 The Promise of Answered Prayer, Inspirio, 2003. 
 Living Abundantly Through God's Blessing, Inspirio, 2004. 
 When God's People Pray Participant's Guide: Six Sessions on the Transforming Power of Prayer, Zondervan, 2007. 
 You Were Made for More: The Life You Have, the Life God Wants You to Have, Zondervan, 2008. 
 Spirit Rising: Tapping into the Power of the Holy Spirit, Zondervan, 2012.

References

External links 
 http://www.brooklyntabernacle.org/

American Protestants
1959 births
American Christian writers
Living people
American people of Ukrainian descent
Navy Midshipmen basketball
United States Naval Academy alumni
University of Rhode Island alumni
Place of birth missing (living people)